The Roman Catholic Archdiocese of Piura is an archdiocese located in the city of Piura in Peru.

History
29 February 1940: Established as Diocese of Piura from the Diocese of Trujillo
30 June 1966: Promoted as Metropolitan Archdiocese of Piura

Bishops

Ordinaries, in reverse chronological order
 Archbishops of Piura (Roman rite), below
 Archbishop José Antonio Eguren Anselmi, S.C.V. (since 2006.07.11)
 Archbishop Oscar Rolando Cantuarias Pastor (1981.09.09 – 2006.07.11)
 Archbishop Fernando Vargas Ruiz de Somocurcio, S.J. (1978.01.18 – 1980.09.26), appointed Archbishop of Arequipa
 Archbishop Erasmo Hinojosa Hurtado (1966.06.30 – 1977.08.06); see below
 Bishops of Piura (Roman rite), below
 Bishop Erasmo Hinojosa Hurtado (1963.01.06 – 1966.06.30); see above
 Bishop Carlos Alberto Arce Masías (1959.02.06 – 1963.01.06)
 Bishop Federico Pérez Silva, C.M. (1953.01.02 – 1957.06.15), appointed Archbishop of Trujillo
 Bishop Fortunato Chirichigno Pontolido, S.D.B. (1941.01.27 – 1953.01.02)

Coadjutor bishops
Federico Pérez Silva, C.M. (1952-1953)
Erasmo Hinojosa Hurtado (1961-1963)

Auxiliary bishops
Federico Richter Fernandez-Prada, O.F.M. (1973-1975), appointed Coadjutor Archbishop of Ayacucho o Huamanga
Emilio Vallebuona Merea, S.D.B. (1975-1978), appointed Bishop of Huaraz
Augusto Beuzeville Ferro (1990-2004)

Other priest of this diocese who became bishop
Jesús Moliné Labarte, appointed Coadjutor Bishop of Chiclayo in 1997

Suffragan dioceses
 Diocese of Chachapoyas
 Diocese of Chiclayo
 Diocese of Chulucanas
 Territorial Prelature of Chota

See also
Roman Catholicism in Peru

Sources
 GCatholic.org
 Catholic Hierarchy
 Diocese website

Roman Catholic dioceses in Peru
Roman Catholic Ecclesiastical Province of Piura
Christian organizations established in 1940
Roman Catholic dioceses and prelatures established in the 20th century